The 2002 Phillip Island V8 Supercar round was the second round of the 2002 V8 Supercar Championship Series. It was held on the weekend of 12 to 14 April at the Phillip Island Grand Prix Circuit in Victoria, Australia.

Race results

Pre-qualifying

Qualifying

Top Ten Shootout

Race 1

Race 2

References

Phillip Island
Motorsport at Phillip Island